Ratho is a village in Edinburgh, Scotland.

Ratho may also refer to:

 Ratho (or Rasso), a German saint
 Ratho, Ontario, a municipality in Ontario

See also 
 Ratho Station, a suburb of Edinburgh